Luana Carolina Carvalho de Souza (born June 11, 1993) is a female Brazilian mixed martial artist who competes in the Flyweight division of the Ultimate Fighting Championship.

Mixed martial arts career

Early career
Starting her career in 2015, Carolina went 4–1 on the regional Brazilian scene before she was invited to  Dana White's Contender Series Brazil 3 on August 11, 2018. She faced Mabelly Lima and won the bout via unanimous decision, getting an UFC contract in the process.

Ultimate Fighting Championship
Carolina made her UFC debut, as a short notice replacement for Wu Yanan, on two days notice against Priscila Cachoeira at UFC 237 on May 11, 2019. Carolina went on to defeat Cachoeira by unanimous decision.

Carolina was scheduled to face Ariane Lipski on May 16, 2020 at UFC Fight Night: Smith vs. Rakić However, on April 9, Dana White, the president of the UFC, announced that this event was postponed to UFC on ESPN: Eye vs. Calvillo on June 13, 2020. Instead the pair eventually fought on July 19, 2020 at UFC Fight Night: Figueiredo vs. Benavidez 2. Carolina lost the fight by submission  by kneebar in the first round.

Carolina, as a replacement for Mayra Bueno Silva, faced Poliana Botelho on May 1, 2021 at UFC on ESPN: Reyes vs. Procházka. At the weigh-ins, Carolina weighed in 128.5 pounds, 2.5 pounds over the women’s flyweight non-title limit. The bout proceeded at catchweight and she will was fined 20% of her purse which will go to Botelho. She won the bout via split decision.

Carolina was scheduled to face Maryna Moroz on October 16, 2021 at UFC Fight Night: Ladd vs. Dumont. However, at the end of September, Moroz pulled out of the bout and was replaced by Sijara Eubanks. In turn Eubanks was pulled from the event due to Covid-19 protocol and she was replaced by Lupita Godinez. Carolina won the fight via unanimous decision.

Carolina faced Molly McCann on March 19, 2022 at UFC Fight Night 204. She lost the fight via knockout in round three.

Carolina faced Joanne Wood on March 18, 2023 at UFC 286. She lost the bout via split decision.

Mixed martial arts record

|-
|Loss
|align=center|8–4
|Joanne Wood
|Decision (split)
|UFC 286
|
|align=center|3
|align=center|5:00
|London, England
|
|-
|Loss
|align=center|8–3
|Molly McCann
|KO (spinning back elbow)
|UFC Fight Night: Volkov vs. Aspinall
|
|align=center|3
|align=center|1:52
|London, England
|
|-
|Win
|align=center|8–2
|Lupita Godinez
|Decision (unanimous)
|UFC Fight Night: Ladd vs. Dumont 
|
|align=center|3
|align=center|5:00
|Las Vegas, Nevada, United States
|
|-
|Win
|align=center|7–2
|Poliana Botelho
|Decision (split)
|UFC on ESPN: Reyes vs. Procházka
|
|align=center|3
|align=center|5:00
|Las Vegas, Nevada, United States
|
|-
| Loss
| align=center| 6–2
| Ariane Lipski
|Submission (kneebar)
|UFC Fight Night: Figueiredo vs. Benavidez 2 
|
|align=center|1
|align=center|1:28
|Abu Dhabi, United Arab Emirates
|
|-
| Win
| align=center| 6–1
| Priscila Cachoeira
|Decision (unanimous)
|UFC 237 
|
|align=center|3
|align=center|5:00
|Rio de Janeiro, Brazil
|
|-
| Win
| align=center|5–1
|Mabelly Lima
|Decision (unanimous)
|Dana White's Contender Series Brazil 3
|
|align=center|3
|align=center|5:00
|Las Vegas, Nevada, United States
|
|-
| Win
| align=center|4–1
|Mary Ellen Sato
|Decision (unanimous)
|Thunder Fight 12
|
|align=center|3
|align=center|5:00
|São Paulo, Brazil
|
|-
| Win
| align=center| 3–1
| Jessica Negrão
|TKO (punches)
|Batalha MMA 3 
|
|align=center|1
|align=center|1:02
|São Paulo, Brazil
|
|-
| Win
| align=center|2–1
| Ana Merlin
|TKO (punches)
| Thunder Fight 5
|
| align=center|1
| align=center|1:10
|São Paulo, Brazil
|
|-
| Win
| align=center| 1–1
| Isabela de Pádua
| Submission (guillotine choke)
|Casa Branca Fight 2
|
| align=center|2
| align=center|N/A
|Casa Branca, Brazil
|
|-
| :Loss
| align=center|0–1
| Daiane Firmino
| Decision (split)
|Arena Combat: Fight Night
|
|align=center|3
|align=center|5:00
|São Sebastião, Brazil
|

See also 
 List of current UFC fighters
 List of female mixed martial artists

References

External links 
  
  

1993 births
Living people
Brazilian female mixed martial artists
Flyweight mixed martial artists
Mixed martial artists utilizing Muay Thai
Mixed martial artists utilizing Brazilian jiu-jitsu
Ultimate Fighting Championship female fighters
Brazilian Muay Thai practitioners
Female Muay Thai practitioners
Brazilian practitioners of Brazilian jiu-jitsu
Female Brazilian jiu-jitsu practitioners
Sportspeople from São Paulo